Phyllopsora amazonica is a species of corticolous (bark-dwelling), crustose lichen in the family Ramalinaceae. It is found in the Amazon rainforest of Brazil.

Taxonomy

Phyllopsora amazonica was formally described as a new species in 2019 by lichenologists Sonja Kistenich and Einar Timdal. The species epithet amazonica refers to its habitat in the Amazon rainforest.

Description
Isidia are frequent, cylindrical to flask-shaped (lageniform), with dimensions of 0.12 by 0.70 mm. The apothecia are rounded, brownish, and small – measuring up to 1 mm in diameter. Phyllopsora amazonica contains atranorin as a major lichen product, as well as several terpenoid compounds.

Similar species
Phyllopsora halei, found in North America, Africa, and Asia, has a sister taxon phylogenetic relationship with P. amazonica. They are somewhat similar in appearance, but differ in the prothallus dimensions and colour (in P. halei, it is more prominent, thicker, and reddish brown), the formation of isidia (in P. hali, they sometimes grow directly out of the prothallus), and the overall form of the thallus (P. halei has rosette-like thalli).

References

Ramalinaceae
Lichens described in 2019
Lichen species
Lichens of Northeast Brazil
Taxa named by Einar Timdal